ACMI can stand for 
Autonomous Air Combat Manoeuvring Instrumentation
Aircraft, Crew, Maintenance and Insurance
Australian Centre for the Moving Image